Boynton is an unincorporated community in Somerset County, Pennsylvania, United States. Boynton has a post office, with ZIP code 15532.

References

Unincorporated communities in Somerset County, Pennsylvania
Unincorporated communities in Pennsylvania